Eulodrobia is a genus of small freshwater snails, aquatic gastropod mollusks in the family Tateidae.

Species
 Eulodrobia bundoona Ponder, W.-H. Zhang, Hallan & Shea, 2019
 Eulodrobia carinata Ponder, W.-H. Zhang, Hallan & Shea, 2019
 Eulodrobia eulo (Ponder & G. A. Clarke, 1990)
 Eulodrobia fenshami Ponder, W.-H. Zhang, Hallan & Shea, 2019
 Eulodrobia ovata Ponder, W.-H. Zhang, Hallan & Shea, 2019
 Eulodrobia spirula Ponder, W.-H. Zhang, Hallan & Shea, 2019

References

External links
 Ponder W., Zhang W.-H. (Wei-Hong), Hallan A. & Shea M. (2019). New taxa of Tateidae (Caenogastropoda, Truncatelloidea) from springs associated with the Great Artesian Basin and Einasleigh Uplands, Queensland, with the description of two related taxa from eastern coastal drainages. Zootaxa. 4583(1): 1-67

Tateidae